Nallathangal Dam is a dam Near Dharapuram in Tirupur district of Tamil Nadu, south India.

Construction 
The dam was constructed of across the Nallathangal odai near bhagavan kovil, Dharapuram Taluk in the year 2007.  It is 12 km away from Dharapuram town.

References

Dams in Tamil Nadu
Dams completed in 2007
Embankment dams
Tiruppur district
2007 establishments in Tamil Nadu